The University of Akron men's soccer team. has had  drafted in Major League Soccer (MLS) as well as seven non-drafted players (most due to homegrown rights). Youth New Zealand international Cameron Knowles was the first 'Zip' to be drafted and play in MLS when he appeared for the Real Salt Lake against the Los Angeles Galaxy on June 22, 2007. In the 2011 draft, the University of Akron made MLS history when five players were selected in the first round, including picks number two through four (as well as pick seven and eight).

Steve Zakuani made an appearance on the DR Congo National Team, and Teal Bunbury, DeAndre Yedlin, Wil Trapp, Perry Kitchen, and Darlington Nagbe have all featured for the United States Men's National Team. Kofi Sarkodie and Zarek Valentin have played for the United States U-20's while Jonathan Lewis, Blair Gavin and Anthony Ampaipitakwong have played for the U-20's and U-17's. Cameron Knowles was part of the New Zealand U-17 squad during the 1999 FIFA U-17 World Championship

Player selection

MLS draft

Non-draft MLS players

References 

Akron Zips MLS Draft